On February 14, 2017, the bodies of Abigail Williams (June 23, 2003 – February 13, 2017) and Liberty German (December 27, 2002 – February 13, 2017) were discovered near the Monon High Bridge Trail, part of the Delphi Historic Trails in Delphi, Indiana, United States, after the girls had disappeared from that trail the previous day. The murders have received extensive media coverage, including reports that video and audio recordings of an individual believed to be their killer were found on German's smartphone.

On October 26, 2022, a suspect was taken into custody and was, on October 31, 2022, charged with two counts of murder. Time magazine described the arrest as "the first major break in a case that has captivated national attention for nearly six years."

Murders 
At 1:35 p.m. on February 13, 2017, 13-year-old Abigail Joyce "Abby" Williams and 14-year-old Liberty Rose Lynn "Libby" German were dropped off by German's older sister, Kelsi German, on County Road 300 North, east of the Hoosier Heartland Highway. The girls were hiking on the Monon High Bridge over Deer Creek, among woodland in remote Deer Creek Township. At 2:07 p.m., German posted a photo of Williams walking the bridge; after this, they were not heard from again. They were reported missing at 5:30 p.m. after they had failed to meet German's father at 3:15 p.m. The families initially searched for the girls themselves before calling the police. Authorities who quickly searched the area did not initially suspect foul play in the disappearance. The bodies were found on the north bank of Deer Creek.

Investigation 

Police have not released details of how the girls were murdered. As early as February 15, 2017, Indiana State Police began circulating a still image of an individual reportedly seen on the Monon High Bridge Trail near where the two friends were slain; the grainy photograph appears to capture a Caucasian male, hands in pockets, head down, walking on the rail bridge, towards the girls. A few days later, the person in the photograph was named the prime suspect in the double-homicide.

On February 22, law enforcement released an audio recording during which the voice of the suspect, although muffled, is heard to say, "Down the hill." At this news conference, officials credited the source of the audio and imagery to German's smartphone and further regarded her as a hero for having had the presence of mind and fortitude to secretly record the exchange. Police indicated that additional evidence from the phone had been secured but would not release further details so as not to "compromise any future trial." By this time, the reward offered in the case was set at $41,000.

On July 17, police distributed a composite sketch of someone sought as a person of prime interest in the murders. The sketch was apparently created from eyewitness accounts of a hiker on the Delphi Historic Trails the day the girls vanished.

On April 22, 2019, Indiana State Police announced a "new direction" in the case and released a new sketch of the suspect, while urging the public to look at the sketch, listen to the audio, watch how the man walks on the bridge and send tips to the tipline email. 
Investigators stated they had reason to believe that the suspect might be hiding in plain sight and was almost certainly familiar with the Delphi area, from living there, working there or for other reasons.
An additional plea was made for help in identifying the driver of a vehicle left abandoned off the Hoosier Heartland Highway in Delphi, at the former Child Services office, between noon and 5 p.m. on the day of the murders.

On July 23, 2019 a suspect who had been wanted for the kidnapping and rape in Tippecanoe County was named as one of multiple suspects being investigated for the Williams and German murders, according to Carroll County Sheriff Tobe Leazenby. The suspect had died by suicide the previous month. On April 27, 2021, Indiana State Police detectives named another suspect as a new person of interest in the Delphi murders.

In December 2021, the Indiana State Police announced the discovery of a fake social media account which had been uncovered during the course of the investigation into the murders.A 27-year-old man from Peru, Indiana who was being held in custody for alleged sex crimes against children, later stated in an interview that he had created the account. In a 2020 interview with police, the man had said he spoke to German the night before she went missing, and planned to meet her on the date of her disappearance. He was not named by police as a person of interest in the investigation.

Arrest and developments 

On October 26, 2022, a suspect was taken into custody and appeared in court on October 28. On October 31, 2022, Indiana State Police announced that the suspect had been charged with two counts of murder in the case. He has pleaded not guilty, and his trial is scheduled to begin in March 2023. Two public defenders were appointed to represent the suspect.

On November 29, Judge Frances Gull issued an order to unseal the probable cause affidavit that led to the suspect's arrest. According to the redacted document, video footage recovered from German's phone showed one of the victims mentioning "gun" as a man wearing a dark jacket and jeans approached them and ordered them to go "down the hill". Investigators believe the suspect is the man seen in the video. Investigators also found a ".40-caliber unspent round" less than two feet from one victim's body, but between the two victims.  It was later determined that the round came from a gun owned by the suspect. A witness said she saw a man walking away from the bridge "wearing a blue colored jacket and blue jeans and was muddy and bloody." Another witness and a tip mentioned that a car was parked "oddly" and appeared to be parked in a way as if to hide its license plate. Investigators said the description of the vehicle matched a vehicle that the suspect owned in 2017. 

According to a probable cause affidavit, the suspect was interviewed by the police in 2017, and said he was on the trail that afternoon for around two hours. The document also said that in a subsequent interview in October 2022, the suspect told authorities he had worn "jeans and a black or blue jacket" that day and had gone to the bridge to "watch fish".

On December 2, Judge Gull issued a gag order until January 2023. The suspect's defense attorneys argued in a motion to move the trial out of Carroll County, based on concerns about juror bias due to what the attorneys described as the "extensive media attention" and the "highly publicized nature of the case" in the local area.

Memorials
In response to a request from German's mother, homeowners across central Indiana have had orange lights installed on their front porches, both to commemorate the girls as well as to indicate that the murderer remains at large.

In August 2017, the families announced their plans to build a sports complex for Delphi in memory of the girls. A non-profit organization, L & A Park Foundation, was formed to "celebrate and commemorate the lives of Libby German and Abby Williams by creating a place for the appreciation of nature, art, play, and athleticism for generations to come." A site was procured a mile north of Delphi, and in the years following the girls' deaths, continued progress has been made in the development of Abby and Libby Memorial Park. In 2020, the L & A Park Foundation was named a recipient of the NBA All-Star 2021 Legacy Grant.

See also 

List of murdered American children
List of unsolved murders
Murder of April Tinsley

References

External links
Delphi Homicide Investigation – Indiana State Police
Seeking Information on Unknown Suspect in Indiana Double-Murder Investigation – Federal Bureau of Investigation
Information Sought in Investigation into Deaths of Liberty German and Abigail Williams – FBI Indianapolis Field Office

2017 in Indiana
2017 murders in the United States
Deaths by person in Indiana
Delphi, Indiana
February 2017 crimes in the United States
Filmed killings
Incidents of violence against girls
Murder in Indiana
Murdered American students
Unsolved murders in the United States
Female murder victims